Longitarsus angelikae is a dark yellow coloured species of beetle from the Chrysomelidae family that is endemic to Antalya, Turkey.

References

A
Beetles described in 2001
Beetles of Asia